I Hate Fairyland is a black comedy fantasy comic written and illustrated by Skottie Young, and published by Image Comics, which started publication in October 2015. The comic follows Gertrude, a woman who was transported to a mystical world called Fairyland as a child. Thirty years later, Gertrude is now an un-aging, violent misanthrope who, alongside her reluctant guide and friend Larry, constantly tries and fails to return to the real world.

While the comic went on hiatus after the release of Issue #20 in July 2018, a revival series written by Young and illustrated by Brett Bean began in November 2022, still under the name I Hate Fairyland but starting with a new #1 issue. The series focuses on Gert now an adult going back to Fairyland under William Wiggans orders to turn it into an amusement park.

Publication history
According to a Paste Magazine interview, Skottie Young first developed the concept while working on 2009's The Wonderful Wizard of Oz limited series at Marvel Comics, with the idea that Dorothy would eventually "be super annoyed by all these characters." Gertrude being an adult stuck in a child's body came from Young's experiences as a new father, finding himself repeatedly reading and watching the same picture books and preschool shows with his child. Young claims Mad Magazine, the DC Comics character Lobo and Tank Girl as other significant influences. The first issue was released on October 14, 2015. It sold an estimated 50,300 copies and was the 42nd best selling issue of the month by units.

The comic went on hiatus after the release of Issue #20 in July 2018, until Young announced in August 2021 that it would be returning. The revived series will still be published by Image Comics and written by Young, and was initially set to feature Brett Parson as the new primary artist. Since the announcement, short side stories illustrated by other artists have been released as timed exclusives for subscribers of Young's Substack newsletter. These stories, which are separate from the main series, will later receive wider publication.

The first issue of the revival series, which restarted its numbering at #1 and now features Brett Bean as the primary artist, was released on November 16, 2022.

Characters
 Gertrude: Also known as Gert is the main protagonist of the series.
 Larry: A fly sidekick to Gert in the original series.
 Queen Cloudia: The main villain of the original series.
 Slug Lord: Ruler of Las Fungus.
 Brudd the Brutal: A Huntsman that Cloudia hires to kill Gertrude.
 Horribella: A witch that Cloudia hires to get rid of Gertrude.
 Darketh Deaddeath: One of the dark lords in the farthest reaches of Fairyland.
 Pervis Peddlesteal: A packrat that collects items from children that visit Fairyland.
 Nickey Nines: The feline leader of the Tower of Battle.
 Purty Pretty Princess: The champion fighter of the Tower of Battle.
 Maddie: A follower of Gert.
 Loveth Lovelord: Ruler of a maze that holds the Balls of Redemption.
 "Bill", Devil of Fairyland: The Ruler of Fairyland's hell.
 Fairyland Council: The ones who dictate the rules of the land and convene when any threat should befall it.
 Happy: Another human child invited to Fairyland by Cloudia.
 Duncan: A boy in a dragon costume that somehow ended up accidentally transported to Fairyland after drinking up too much slushie during Halloween.
 William Wiggins: A tycoon in the revival series who is likely the main villain.
 Rotwald Rat: A talking Rat from the revival series who came into the real world by accident
 Virgil: A demon who guides Rotwald and Gert into hell.
 Cutey Pukey: The original gertling was killed by Gert to stop the gertlings rampage but comes back to life.

Plot

Madly Ever After
The plot starts with Gertrude falling into Fairyland as a six-year-old. She spends 27 years looking for a key to escape with her assigned insect guide Larrigton Weighston III, or Larry for short, but never ages, resulting in her becoming a violent sociopath. After terrorizing Fairyland, Queen Cloudia, the secretly evil ruler of Fairyland, sends after Gertrude many 'villains', such as a witch named Horribella. With each attempt ending in failure, Queen Cloudia then decides to kill her personally. She consults the Fairyland Council and they devise a plan to rid of Gertrude. As the Queen cannot directly harm any guests, Cloudia invites another child, Happy, into Fairyland, to make Gertude a citizen of Fairyland. Gertude confronts Happy and shortly tries to kill her, but is easily defeated by Happy. After Gertrude recovers, she visits Queen Cloudia and asks her what is going on. Cloudia tells her she's too late, and admits she helped Happy on her quest to find the key. Sometime after, Happy does find the key. Annoyed by this, Gertrude finds Darketh Deaddeath, who she asks to help her defeat Happy. He agrees to help her, only if she proves herself. She survives his dungeon, and insults him. He then decides to help her and gives her his dark magic powers. Happy almost uses the key to exit Fairyland, but then a super-powered Gertrude stops her in her tracks. After a brief battle, Gertrude defeats Happy and then kills Cloudia. Before Gertrude can return home, Larry informs her that killing the Queen makes her the Queen herself, resulting in her unhappily taking the throne.

Fluff My Life
After a disastrous year as Fairyland's "evil queen", Gertrude is impeached and resumes looking for a way home. While meeting with Pervis Peddlesteal, an anthropomorphic rat who collects artefacts from Earth, she encounters Duncan, a human boy dressed in a dragon Halloween costume recently arrived in Fairyland. Duncan joins Gertrude on her travels, however, she willingly abandons him in the Tower of Battle, a gigantic arcade machine populated by powerful fighters. One hundred years later, Duncan has become an actual giant dragon and lays waste to Fairyland, killing all but a small handful of survivors, including Gertrude and Larry. Using the last remaining magic in Fairyland, Larry transports Gertrude back in time to the present of the series to warn her younger self away from the decisions that lead to the destruction of Fairyland. The older Gertrude gives her younger self step-by-step instructions to avert the apocalypse, but wearily notes that she has not listened to any of them, fading from existence as her younger self rushes into the first of many disasters.

I Hate Image
After beating up Kamau Kogo on Bitch Planet and learning how to traverse the Image Universe to return home, Gertrude kills versions of Rick Grimes and Coach Euless Boss before following the Paper Girls into Image City. After being led to the god-run nightclub Wic + Div by Tony Chu, Gertrude sets off a battle royale between the various superheroes and villains within, stealing their weaponry in the process, before seeking out the aid of Spawn to give her access to the Image Central building. After killing everyone in the building and confronting the founders of Image Comics, Gertrude demands to be allowed to go home, killing them all as a show of force before realising she needed one of them alive to return home. Dejected, Gertrude returns to Fairyland with Larry.

Good Girl
Gertrude meets Maddie, a denizen of Fairyland and her self-proclaimed "biggest fan", who idolises Gertude for the violence and death she has spread. Although initially happy to take Maddie on as a protege, Gertrude quickly becomes sick of her, and realizes that she does not like the person she has become. She murders Maddie and resolves to become a better person. Despite her best intentions, Gertrude repeatedly fails to do good, leaving just as much death and destruction in her wake. However, Larry tells her of a mysterious labyrinth which could hold the secret to helping her become good, and concedes that, as miserable as his life with Gertrude has been, it probably would have been even worse had they never met. When they reach the labyrinth, its master, Loveth Lovelord, makes Gertrude a deal; if she can reach the center of the labyrinth before the next "Lover's Moon" and find the "Balls of Redemption", all the evil will be purged from her being, if she fails, she must become his wife. Gertrude manages to find the centre of the labyrinth, and Loveth unleashes the beast that guards the Balls, which turns out to be Duncan. Despite Duncan demonstrating the newly acquired draconic powers of flight and fire breathing, Gertrude easily defeats him and touches the Balls of Redemption, becoming a perfectly good and sweet child similar to Happy. The newly good Gertrude makes quick progress in her quest, prompting Horribella to hire the deadliest assassins in Fairyland to stop her on behalf of an unseen "Ruler of All That is Dark". Gertrude finds her key and heads back to the centre of Fairyland to finally leave. Horribella's assassins attack her, but all inexplicably miss her when they throw their weapons. Gertude picks up a lollipop and skips towards the door, but trips and falls at the last moment, causing the lollipop to penetrate her brain, killing her instantly. As Larry quietly mourns her death, Gertude descends into Hell, with the effects of the Balls reversed. Upon arriving in Hell, she is met by the "Ruler of All That Is Dark" – Happy.

Sadly Never After
The ruler of Hell is revealed not to be Happy, but a shapeshifting demon named Bill assuming her form. After failing to torment Gertrude with a twisted version of her home, he condemns her to an eternity of repeating her quest. Meanwhile, Horribella calls Bill and demands Queen Cloudia's bones, her payment for engineering Gertrude's death. Bill has the bones delivered to her by Duncan, who has become a postal courier. Horribella, planning to bring about the end of Fairyland, resurrects Cloudia as a powerful undead being who kills her and goes on a destructive rampage. Realising that Gertrude is the only one who can defeat "Dark Cloudia", Duncan and Larry confront the Fairyland Council and tell them that they must resurrect Gertrude to save Fairyland. The Council initially refuse, citing the rules of Fairyland, but Duncan retorts that the rules, and the council, are directly responsible for the crisis, and that by kidnapping children like him and Gertrude, they have abdicated any moral authority. One of the Council member concedes that Duncan is correct, and orders Bill to deliver the pocket dimension containing Gertrude's Hell to the council chamber. Duncan and Larry enter Hell and inform Gertrude about Dark Cloudia; subsequently, Gertrude agrees to kill Cloudia again. When returned to Fairyland she attempts to renege on the deal and demands to return to Hell when she realizes that her actions would serve the council's purpose. The Council nevertheless promises to return Gertrude home if she succeeds, and forcibly empowers her with their combined magic. Meanwhile, Dark Cloudia destroys the army of King Cone, the new Fairyland king, who tried to stop her wave of destruction in vain. Before the villain could slay the king, however, Gertrude appears and attacks her with her new magical powers, depowering Dark Cloudia and beating her up. Although Gertrude almost kills Cloudia again, Larry reminds her that the Council never specified that Cloudia has to die in their request, and Gertrude decides to follow his advice for once and gives the defeated villain to King Cone in order to be imprisoned for her crimes. The Council then appears, angry because Gertrude didn't kill Cloudia (despite the fact that she technically fulfilled their request) and threatening to exile her to a remote place in Fairyland, until Gertrude reminds them that she still has their combined magic inside her and would use it to kill them unless they honour their part of the deal, and the fearful Council quickly sends her back home, much to Larry's sorrow. Back on Earth, Gertrude, now an adult woman in her thirties, finds herself employed as a clerk in a television station, ironically frustrated by her mundane job and looking for a way to return. However, she abandons her search and ruefully curses Fairyland one last time before getting back to work, determined to face her lot in life.

2022 Revival
The now adult Gert is unable to keep a job, as she lacks any education or skills applicable to the real world, and misses Fairyland where she was notorious and feared. After she is beaten up in a bar and dumped in an alley, a tech billionaire named William Wiggins hires her to find his missing son, who he believes has been taken to Fairyland. Gert agrees, in exchange for half the profits from the planet-wide theme park that Wiggins intends to build on Fairyland once the expedition is complete. He sends Gert and Rotwald Rat, a talking rat from Fairyland who his scientists accidentally brought to Earth; through a portal to Fairyland. They emerge at the gates of the Inferno, a hell-like dimension created to prevent previous visitors to Fairyland re-entering. They meet a demon named Virgil, who agrees to guide them through the Inferno and into Fairyland, promising the journey will last a few days. However, Gert eats Virgil's map and they are lost in the Inferno for years.  Along the way they inadvertently create additional dangers for themselves, including a ravenous "gertling" known as "Cutey Pukey", and a golem created from a monster's stomach contents which lusts after Gert.

Gert, Rotwald and Virgil are finally able to complete a series of fetch quests to reach the end of the Inferno and obtain a ticket into Fairyland. Gert tearfully bids farewell to Virgil and re-enters Fairyland. As soon as they cross through the portal, Rotwald receives a call from Wiggins, who tells Gert that his son has shown up on Earth and that he has no intention of extracting Gert due to legal issues, leaving her once again trapped in Fairyland permanently. Gert kicks Rotwald in a rage, declaring "I hate Fairyland!". Rotwald lands some distance away in front of the latest "guest" of Fairyland, and Larry who is shocked at hearing Gert had returned.

Collected editions

Trade paperbacks

Hardcovers

Reception
According to the review aggregation website Comic Book Roundup, the first issue of I Hate Fairyland received an average score of 8.6/10 from critics, based on 21 reviews. National Public Radio's Etelka Lehocky described it as "a great palate cleanser for anyone who's recoiled from pink-princess politics" and praised "Young's clever storytelling". IGN included it as one of the "Top Comics to read this week".

References

Image Comics titles
Fantasy comics
2015 comics debuts